The Suffragette Minstrels is a short silent movie from 1913 written by Dorothy Gish and directed by Dell Henderson. It starred Sylvia Ashton and included Gertrude Bambrick, William Beaudine, and William J. Butler, among others.

External links

1913 films
1913 short films
American silent short films
American black-and-white films
Films directed by Dell Henderson
Silent American drama films
1913 drama films
1910s American films
American drama short films